John McEnery (1 November 1943 – 12 April 2019) was an English actor and writer.

Born in Birmingham, he trained (1962–1964) at the Bristol Old Vic Theatre School, playing, among others, Mosca in Ben Jonson's Volpone and Gaveston in Marlowe's Edward II. At the age of 20 he found his first stage work, spending three seasons with the Everyman Theatre in Liverpool. He joined the National Theatre company in 1966. While working at the Everyman, he met actress Stephanie Beacham, whom he later married. The couple had two daughters but subsequently divorced. He has another daughter from a previous relationship with artist Sofi Bollack.

His first notable screen role was in 1968 as Mercutio in Franco Zeffirelli's Romeo and Juliet; he was nominated for a BAFTA Award for his performance. He took the title role in the 1970 film Bartleby, in which he starred opposite Paul Scofield. In 1971 he starred in a major role alongside Claude Jade and Jean-Pierre Cassel in Gérard Brach's bittersweet The Boat on the Grass about a girl between two friends. In this film are references to his stage roles when he declaims Hamlet or when he sings in duet with Claude Jade "God Save the Queen". He later played Russian politician Alexander Kerensky in Nicholas and Alexandra (1971). His other film credits include The Duellists, Black Beauty, The Land That Time Forgot (1974) and The Krays (1990, as gangster Eddie Pellam), When Saturday Comes, as well as Mel Gibson’s Hamlet.

In the 1980s, at Sheffield's Crucible Theatre, he took the title role in Gogol's The Government Inspector, directed by the Russian actor and director Oleg Tabakov, also performing on stage in Little Malcolm and His Struggle against the Eunuchs (Wick Blagdon), Rosencrantz and Guildenstern Are Dead (Hamlet), Nicholas Nickleby (Mr Mantalini/Mr Snevellicci), Waiting for Godot, Curse of the Starving Classes for the RSC, Taking Sides, Precious Bane with Vanessa Redgrave, Coriolanus with Steven Berkoff, and Bingo with Patrick Stewart. In 2011 he appeared as Rowley in The School for Scandal (directed by Deborah Warner) at the Barbican Centre. For television, his credits include Our Mutual Friend, The Scarlet Pimpernel, Little Dorrit, The Buddha of Suburbia, Tusitala (as Robert Louis Stevenson), Jamaica Inn, Confessions of an English Opium-Eater (Thomas De Quincey), and the title role in Caligula A.D. In 2008 he appeared in a guest role in "Sidetracked", the first episode of Wallander. 

Joining The Globe Theatre in 1997 for its inaugural productions Henry V (Pistol), and As You Like It (Jaques), over the next ten years he performed in King Lear (The Fool), Richard II (John of Gaunt and The Gardener), Edward II (Archbishop Of Canterbury), Pericles (Pericles), The Merchant of Venice (Shylock), Antony and Cleopatra (Enobarbus), A Mad World my Masters (Master Shortrod Harebrain), A Chaste Maid In Cheapside, and Romeo and Juliet (Mercutio).  

In 1998, his play Merry Christmas, Mr. Burbage'', written in honour of the 400th anniversary of the creation of the Globe Theatre, was performed at the site of the original Theatre in Shoreditch, a venue from which four centuries earlier the Burbage players had been forced to move, bearing the beams and posts and other remnants which when reassembled south of the Thames would become The Globe. With the support of then Artistic Director of The Globe, Sir Mark Rylance, the play ended with an ox and cart bearing a pair of oak beams leading a procession through Shoreditch down to the Thames and on to The Globe, where the oaks remain with a dedication to the Burbages. 

Later he worked and performed with the Malachites, including performing as Lear at the site of The Rose theatre in 2015, helping preserve the many ties between Shakespeare and Shoreditch, and 'the Actors’ Church' St Leonard's, at which his play 'Raising Burbage' was performed, and where his ashes are scattered. Co-founder of the Shakespeare in Shoreditch Society, along with friend and fellow Shoreditch resident Paul Geake, the society's legacy of reviving Shakespeare's spirit in the borough continues with Bard-inspired and infused events, such as the Globe Sonnet Walks, for which John performed Sonnet 129 outside St Leonard's Church. 

He had two brothers, the actor Peter McEnery, and the photographer David McEnery.

Filmography

References

External links 

1943 births
2019 deaths
English male film actors
English writers
Alumni of Bristol Old Vic Theatre School
Male actors from Birmingham, West Midlands
20th-century English male actors
21st-century English male actors
English male writers